Joel Brandon López Pissano (born 6 January 1997) is an Argentine professional footballer who plays as an attacking midfielder for Atlético Grau, on loan from Rosario Central.

Career
López Pissano began his career with Rosario Central. His promotion into the seniors came under manager Leonardo Fernández in February 2018, with the midfielder coming on from the substitutes bench in an Argentine Primera División fixture with Unión Santa Fe on 3 February; his next match was also his first professional start, playing the full duration of a 5–0 home win over Olimpo. López Pissano scored in first-team football for the first time on 11 March during a draw away to Vélez Sarsfield. He ended 2017–18 with thirteen appearances in all competitions, which included his Copa Sudamericana bow in April against São Paulo.

On 24 July 2018, López Pissano was loaned to Ecuadorian Serie A side Emelec. He remained there for twelve months, appearing in twenty-six fixtures across two seasons; including three games in the Copa Libertadores. The midfielder returned to Rosario in June 2019, subsequently spending the next year with their reserves. He began appearing for Rosario's first-team towards the end of 2020, as he made six appearances in the Copa de la Liga Profesional. On 20 January 2021, López Pissano returned to Ecuador to sign on loan with Orense.

Career statistics
.

References

External links

1997 births
Living people
Footballers from Rosario, Santa Fe
Argentine footballers
Association football midfielders
Argentine expatriate footballers
Expatriate footballers in Ecuador
Argentine expatriate sportspeople in Ecuador
Argentine Primera División players
Ecuadorian Serie A players
Rosario Central footballers
C.S. Emelec footballers
Orense S.C. players